Operation Wahiawa was an operation conducted by the 25th Infantry Division in Hậu Nghĩa Province, lasting from 16 to 30 May 1966.

Prelude
U.S. intelligence indicated that the Viet Cong (VC) 1st Battalion, 165A Regiment and its headquarters and supply depots were located in the Filhol Plantation, the Ho Bo Woods and the Boi Loi Woods (now in Binh Duong Province).

Operation

Due to the proximity of the operational area to the 25th Division's Củ Chi Base Camp, Division commander BG Frederick C. Weyand committed the entire division to the operation. The division's sweeps encountered sporadic resistance and uncovered numerous supply caches.

Aftermath
Operation Wahiawa officially concluded on 30 May, the US had claimed VC losses were 157 killed.

References

Conflicts in 1966
1966 in Vietnam
Battles involving the United States
Battles involving Vietnam
Battles and operations of the Vietnam War in 1966
Battles and operations of the Vietnam War
History of Bình Dương province